Solitary chemosensory cells (SCCs) (also called solitary chemoreceptor cells) are isolated elements located in epithelia of the apparatuses of endodermic origin (such as respiratory and digestive apparatuses). In the aquatic vertebrates, SCCs are also present in the skin. In oral cavity, SCCs precedes the development of taste buds. For long time, SCCs were considered to be typical of aquatic vertebrates. Recently, these elements were also demonstrated in mammals.

The SCCs share common morphological and biochemical characteristics with the taste cells located in taste buds of the oro-pharyngeal cavity. In particular, they may express molecules of the chemoreceptorial cascade (such as trans-membrane taste receptors, the G-protein gustducin, PLCbeta2, IP3R3, TRPM5). Morphologically, the elements of SCCs are polymorphic. Some of them have an apical tuft of rigid microvilli (brush cells). Other elements have secretory exocrine granules and others may have endocrine differentiation. Often these elements are innervated. In the upper respiratory system the SCCs are contacted by the sensory endings of trigeminal nerve fibers (SubP and CGRP immunoreactive).
The SCCs of the aquatic vertebrates play a role in food search and predator avoidance. The functional role of the SCCs located in internal organs of mammals is unknown also if several hypotheses have been advanced. In nasal cavity, SCCs operate as sentinels being involved in detection of irritants and are important in the protection of the airway.

See also
Diffuse chemosensory system
Chemosensory clusters

References
Sbarbati A, Crescimanno C, Benati D, Osculati F. Solitary chemosensory cells in the developing chemoreceptorial epithelium of the vallate papilla. Journal of Neurocytology 1998; 27:631–35.
Sbarbati A, Crescimanno C, Bernardi P, Osculati F. Alpha-gustducin immunoreactive solitary chemosensory cells in the developing chemoreceptorial epithelium of the rat vallate papilla. Chem senses 1999; 24:469–72.
Sbarbati A, Osculati F. Solitary chemosensory cells in mammals? Cell Tissue Organs 2003; 175:51-55.
Finger TE, Bottger B, Hansen A, Anderson KT, Alimohammadi H, Silver WL. Solitary chemoreceptor cells in the nasal cavity serve as sentinels of respiration. Proc Natl Acad Sci USA 2003; 100: 8981–86.
Gilbertson TA, Damak S, Margolskee RF. The molecular physiology of taste transduction. Curr Opin Neurobiol 2000; 10: 519–27.
Margolskee RF. Molecular mechanisms of bitter and sweet taste transduction. J Biol Chem 2002; 277:1–4.
Gulbransen BD, Finger TE. Solitary chemoreceptor cell proliferation in adult nasal epithelium. Journal of Neurocytology 2000; 34:117-22.
Hansen A, Witt M, Hummel T. Unconventional neurons in the nasal cavity of humans. Chem Senses 2005; 30:A55.
Hansen A. Unconventional sensory cells in the nasal epithelia of rodents and humans. Chem Senses 2006b; 31:E4. 
Höfer D, Drenckhahn D. Cytoskeletal markers allowing discrimination between brush and other epithelial cells of the gut including etnteroendocrine cells. Histochem Cell Biol 1996; 105:405 –12.
Höfer D, Drenckhahn D. Identification of the taste cell G-protein alpha-gustducin in brush cells of the rat pancreatic duct system. Histochem Cell Bio1998; 110: 303–309.
Höfer D, Puschel B, Drenckhahn D.  Taste receptor-like cells in the rat gut identified by expression of α-gustducin. Proc Natl Acad Sci USA 1996; 93:  6631– 34.
Merigo F, Benati D, Tizzano M, Osculati F, Sbarbati A. α-gustducin immunoreactivity in the airways. Cell Tissue Res  2005; 319: 211–19.
Merigo F, Benati D, DiChio M, Osculati F, Sbarbati A.  Secretory cells of the airway express molecules of the chemoreceptive cascade. Cell Tissue Res 2007; 327: 231–247.
Sbarbati A, Crescimanno C, Benati D, Osculati F. Solitary chemosensory cells in the developing chemoreceptorial epithelium of the vallate papilla. Journal of Neurocytology 1998; 27:631–35.
Sbarbati A, Crescimanno C, Bernardi P, Osculati F. Alpha-gustducin immunoreactive solitary chemosensory cells in the developing chemoreceptorial epithelium of the rat vallate papilla. Chem senses 1999; 24:469–72.
Sbarbati A., Merigo F, Benati D, Tizzano M, Bernardi P, Crescimanno C, Osculati F. Identification and characterization of a specific sensory epithelium in the rat larynx. J Comp Neurol 2004a; 475:188-201.
Sbarbati A., Merigo F, Benati D, Tizzano M, Bernardi P, Osculati F. Laryngeal chemosensory clusters. Chem Senses 2004b; 29:683-92. 
Tizzano M, Merigo F, Sbarbati A. Evidence of solitary chemosensory cells in a large mammal: the diffuse chemosensory system in Bos Taurus airways. J Anat2006; 209 (3): 333 – 7.
Zancanaro Caretta CM, Merigo F, Cavaggioni A, Osculati F. α-gustducin expression in the vomeronasal organ of the mouse. Eur J Neurosci 1999 11: 4473 – 4475.
Whitear M. Solitary chemoreceptor cells. In: Chemoreception in fishes. Hara T.J. (Ed) Chapman and Hall New York 1992; pp. 103–125.
Whitear M, Kotrschal K. The chemosensory anterior dorsal fin in rocklings (Gaidopsarus and Ciliata, Teleostei, Gadidae): activity, fine structure and innervation. J Zool 1988; 216:339-366.

External links
SCC Discovery in fishes

Sensory systems
Sensory receptors